M110 or M-110 may refer to:
 HMS Ramsey (M110)
 M110 155mm Cartridge, a U.S. Army chemical artillery shell
 Mercedes-Benz M110 engine, a 2.8L engine produced from 1973 to 1986
 Messier 110 (M110), an elliptical galaxy in the constellation Andromeda
 M110 howitzer, a United States Army self-propelled howitzer
 M110 Semi-Automatic Sniper System, a semi-automatic rifle
 M110A1 Rifle, a semi-automatic rifle
 M-110 (Michigan highway), a state highway in Michigan